Jaturapat Sattham (born 15 June 1999) is a Thai professional footballer who plays as a left back at Port and the Thailand national team.

International career
On 12 April 2021, He was named in manager Akira Nishino’s 47-man squad for Thailand’s 2022 World Cup qualification he play the friendly matches against Tajikistan.

Honour

International
Thailand U-19
 2017 AFF U-19 Youth Championship: Champion

Thailand U-23
 Southeast Asian Games  Silver medal: 2021

References

External links

1999 births
Living people
Jaturapat Sattham
Jaturapat Sattham
Jaturapat Sattham
Association football defenders
Jaturapat Sattham
Jaturapat Sattham
Jaturapat Sattham
Competitors at the 2021 Southeast Asian Games
Southeast Asian Games medalists in football
Jaturapat Sattham